"Brave Heroes of Bataan" is a World War II march style song written for piano and published in 1943. Composed by Frank H. Grey, it was published by Theodore Presser Co. The lyrics refer to the Battle of Bataan.

The cover page shows four very apprehensive and gaunt-looking soldiers huddling in a foxhole.

The sheet music can be found at the Pritzker Military Museum & Library.

References

Bibliography
Walsh, Thomas P. Tin Pan Alley and the Philippines: American Songs of War and Love, 1898-1946: a Resource Guide. 2013.  

1943 songs
Songs of World War II
March music
Songs about the Philippines
Songs based on actual events